Coesfeld – Steinfurt II is an electoral constituency (German: Wahlkreis) represented in the Bundestag. It elects one member via first-past-the-post voting. Under the current constituency numbering system, it is designated as constituency 127. It is located in northern North Rhine-Westphalia, comprising the Coesfeld district and southwestern parts of the Steinfurt district.

Coesfeld – Steinfurt II was created for the 1965 federal election. Since 2017, it has been represented by Marc Henrichmann of the Christian Democratic Union (CDU).

Geography
Coesfeld – Steinfurt II is located in northern North Rhine-Westphalia. As of the 2021 federal election, it comprises the entirety of the Coesfeld district and the municipalities of Altenberge, Laer, and Nordwalde from the Steinfurt district.

History
Coesfeld – Steinfurt II was created in 1965 and contained parts of the abolished constituencies of Lüdinghausen – Coesfeld and Steinfurt – Tecklenburg. Originally, it was known as Steinfurt – Coesfeld. From 1980 through 1998, it was named Coesfeld – Steinfurt I. It acquired its current name in the 2002 election. In the 1965 through 1976 elections, it was constituency 96 in the numbering system. From 1980 through 1998, it was number 97. From 2002 through 2009, it was number 128. Since 2013, it has been number 127.

Originally, the constituency comprised the entirety of the Coesfeld and Steinfurt districts. In the 1980 through 1998 elections, it comprised the Coesfeld district and western parts of the Steinfurt district. It acquired its current borders in the 2002 election.

Members
The constituency has been held continuously by the Christian Democratic Union (CDU) since its creation. It was first represented by Heinrich Hörnemann from 1965 to 1969. Gottfried Köster then served as representative from 1969 to 1980. Wilhelm Rawe served from 1980 to 1994, followed by Werner Lensing from 1994 to 2005. Karl Schiewerling served from then until 2017. Marc Henrichmann was elected in 2017 and re-elected in 2021.

Election results

2021 election

2017 election

2013 election

2009 election

References

Federal electoral districts in North Rhine-Westphalia
1965 establishments in West Germany
Constituencies established in 1965
Coesfeld (district)
Steinfurt (district)